Peristichia toreta, common name the tower pyram, is a species of small sea snail, a marine gastropod mollusc in the family Pyramidellidae, the pyrams and their allies.

Description
The length of an adult shell can be as much as 13.5 mm. The shell has two basal keels. The axial sculpture consists of strong ribs, and the spiral sculpture consists of strong ridges.

Distribution
This species occurs in the following locations:
 Gulf of Mexico
 Atlantic Ocean off North Carolina

References

External links
 To Biodiversity Heritage Library (11 publications)
 To Encyclopedia of Life
 To USNM Invertebrate Zoology Mollusca Collection
 To ITIS
 To World Register of Marine Species
 Another image at the BMSM website

Pyramidellidae
Gastropods described in 1889